A white card is a citizen-owned automobile in Hong Kong used as an illegal unlicensed taxi.  The term is a reference to fake taxi licenses. Actually it refers to the white license plates.  Before 1983, taxis in Hong Kong had black license plates, while private cars had white license plates.  So using a private car as unlicensed taxis was known as "white license plate" (or translated as "white card")

History
White cards have been used since the 1950s, when there was a shortage of public transportation. In the 1950s, Hong Kong taxis were limited in numbers.  People started their own illegal businesses, and operated without any licenses or government regulation.

See also
1950s in Hong Kong
Illegal taxicab operation
Taxicabs of Hong Kong

References

Transport in Hong Kong